Nyarlathotep is a fictional character created by H. P. Lovecraft. The character is a malign deity in the Cthulhu Mythos, a shared universe. First appearing in Lovecraft's 1920 prose poem "Nyarlathotep", he was later mentioned in other works by Lovecraft and by other writers. Later writers describe him as one of the Outer Gods, an alien pantheon.

Appearances

In the works of H. P. Lovecraft
In his first appearance in "Nyarlathotep" (1920), he is described as a "tall, swarthy man" who resembles an ancient Egyptian pharaoh. In this story he wanders the Earth, seemingly gathering legions of followers, the narrator of the story among them, through his demonstrations of strange and seemingly magical instruments. These followers lose awareness of the world around them, and through the narrator's increasingly unreliable accounts, the reader gets an impression of the world's collapse. Fritz Leiber proposes three interpretations of the character based on this appearance: the universe's mockery of man's attempts to understand it; a negative view of the commercial world, represented by Nyarlathotep's self-promotion and contemptuous attitude; and man's self-destructive rationality.

Nyarlathotep subsequently appears as a major character in The Dream Quest of Unknown Kadath (1926/27), in which he again manifests in the form of an Egyptian pharaoh when he confronts protagonist Randolph Carter.  Leiber describes Nyarlathotep as "evilly intelligent" in this story, in contrast to the mindless Azathoth, his master.

The 21st sonnet of Lovecraft's poem-cycle Fungi from Yuggoth (1929/30) is essentially a retelling of the original prose poem.

In "The Dreams in the Witch House" (1933), Nyarlathotep appears to Walter Gilman and witch Keziah Mason (who has made a pact with the entity) in the form of "the 'Black Man' of the witch-cult", a black-skinned avatar of the Devil described by witch hunters.  Although inhuman, some characters mistake him as a human of African descent, though his facial features are described as Caucasian.

Finally, in "The Haunter of the Dark" (1936), the nocturnal, tentacled, bat-winged monster dwelling in the steeple of the Starry Wisdom sect's church is identified as another manifestation of Nyarlathotep. This avatar cannot tolerate light.

Lovecraft suggests that the fake Henry Akeley that appears at the end of The Whisperer in Darkness (1930) is also Nyarlathotep. In the story, the Mi-Go chant his name in reverential tones, stating "To Nyarlathotep, Mighty Messenger, must all things be told. And he shall put on the semblance of man, the waxen mask and the robes that hide, and come down from the world of Seven Suns to mock." At the end of The Whisperer in Darkness, the main character to his horror discovers a loose dressing gown and the dismembered head and arms of Akeley lying on the couch, presumed in the story to have been a Mi-Go in disguise. But due to the mention in the chant to Nyarlathotep wearing the "waxen mask and the robes that hide", S. T. Joshi writes that "this seems a clear allusion to Nyarlathotep disguised with Akeley's face and hands; but if so, it means that at this time Nyarlathotep is, in bodily form, one of the fungi — especially if, as seems likely, Nyarlathotep is one of the two buzzing voices Albert Wilmarth overhears at the end." Joshi notes this is problematic, because "if Nyarlathotep is (as critics have termed it) a 'shapeshifter', why would he have to don the face and hands of Akeley instead of merely reshaping himself as Akeley?"

Though Nyarlathotep appears as a character in only four stories and two sonnets, his name is mentioned frequently in other works. In "The Rats in the Walls" (1924), Nyarlathotep is mentioned as a faceless god in the caverns of Earth's center. In The Shadow Out of Time (1936), the "hideous secret of Nyarlathotep" is revealed to the protagonist by Khephnes during their imprisonment by the Great Race of Yith.

Nyarlathotep does not appear in Lovecraft's story "The Crawling Chaos" (1920/21), despite the similarity of the title to the character's epithet.  Lovecraft wrote to a correspondent that he reused the phrase because he "liked the sound of it".

Other appearances
Nyarlathotep has also appeared outside of Lovecraft's own writings. The light novel and anime series Haiyore! Nyaruko-san (2009) is based on the Cthulhu mythos, with the main character Nyaruko directly referring to Nyarlathotep.

Nyarlathotep appears in the guise of the Dark Man in Larry Correia's story "Dead Waits Dreaming" (2013).

Though he does not appear in Lovecraft's original short story, Nyarlathotep in his "Black Man" form appears in the 1993 comic book adaption of The Music of Erich Zann (Caliber), in flashbacks for the eponymous Erich Zann.

Alan Moore's limited comic series Neonomicon (2010-2011) utilizes Nyarlathotep in the form of Johnny Carcosa, a masked drug dealer who frequents Cthulhu-themed clubs and occult shops. His manner of converting new followers is to place them in a vegetative state, susceptible to "Aklo"—words related to Lovecraft's work, which alter the consciousness of those who listen to them. In Moore's story, he serves the allegorical role of the Archangel Gabriel at the Annunciation, informing the protagonist that she has been impregnated and will soon give birth to Cthulhu. Carcosa takes a more active role in Moore's follow-up volume Providence, "rewarding" the protagonist, Robert Black, for his work as the "herald" of H. P. Lovecraft's effects on the world and later overseeing the birth of Cthulhu.

In the video game Dusk, Nyarlathotep appears as the final enemy encounter. Instead of taking the form of a humanoid in the fight, however, he takes the form of a leviathan eldritch beast. How he has been worked into the plot is deliberately very vague, as he only appears at the very end, though it is clear that he was up to the trickery and manipulation of his past portrayals.

In the Manga series ‘GHOST REAPER GIRL’ the head of the Eastern Branch is a woman called “Nyarlathotep” who uses the title “The Chaos”.  She is a dark skinned woman, with the lower half of the eye of Horus below her right eye.

Nyarlathotep is featured in several of the Shin Megami Tensei games, as well as the spin-off Persona series video games, including Revelations: Persona and also the duology of Persona 2: Innocent Sin and Persona 2: Eternal Punishment, in which he is the main antagonist. He showcases shape shifting abilities there, by donning several characters' appearances and when fought as "himself", changes to a more unsettling and tentacled appearance. Although it can be noted that when defeated for the last time, he switches back to the human appearance of one of the playable characters.

In Charles Stross' series The Laundry Files, a human avatar of Nyarlathotep under the name Fabian Everyman becomes UK's prime minister.

In the mobile video game Dragalia Lost, there is a dragon named Nyarlathotep who appears in the Accursed Archives raid event, This dragon also possesses a young girl named Lathna.

Nyarlathotep appears as a playable unit in the 2016 Japanese mobile game Tokyo Afterschool Summoners, where he's depicted as a popular DJ with a rep for causing chaos simply to cause chaos.

Nyarlathotep is also the focus of an augmented reality game distributed by The Mysterious Package Company, which includes several physical artifacts, and an interactive app with which to interact with those artifacts.

Nyarlathotep also appears in the loosely-based 'Azathoth Rising' by Joseph S. Dale, as the guardian of the Necronomicon, as he tries to make wizards and other people of power use the spells in the book ostensibly to gain power.  This is of course a trap, as several of the people find out to their chagrin.

Inspiration

In a 1921 letter to Reinhardt Kleiner, Lovecraft related the dream he had had—described as "the most realistic and horrible [nightmare] I have experienced since the age of ten"—that served as the basis for his prose poem "Nyarlathotep". In the dream, he received a letter from his friend Samuel Loveman that read:

Don't fail to see Nyarlathotep if he comes to Providence. He is horrible—horrible beyond anything you can imagine—but wonderful. He haunts one for hours afterwards. I am still shuddering at what he showed.

Lovecraft commented:

I had never heard the name NYARLATHOTEP before, but seemed to understand the allusion. Nyarlathotep was a kind of itinerant showman or lecturer who held forth in public halls and aroused widespread fear and discussion with his exhibitions. These exhibitions consisted of two parts—first, a horrible—possibly prophetic—cinema reel; and later some extraordinary experiments with scientific and electrical apparatus. As I received the letter, I seemed to recall that Nyarlathotep was already in Providence.... I seemed to remember that persons had whispered to me in awe of his horrors, and warned me not to go near him. But Loveman's dream letter decided me.... As I left the house I saw throngs of men plodding through the night, all whispering affrightedly and bound in one direction. I fell in with them, afraid yet eager to see and hear the great, the obscure, the unutterable Nyarlathotep.

Will Murray has speculated that this dream image of Nyarlathotep may have been inspired by the inventor Nikola Tesla, whose well-attended lectures did involve extraordinary experiments with electrical apparatus and whom some saw as a sinister figure.

Robert M. Price proposes that the name Nyarlathotep may have been subconsciously suggested to Lovecraft by two names from Lord Dunsany, an author he much admired. Alhireth-Hotep, a false prophet, appears in Dunsany's The Gods of Pegana, and Mynarthitep, a god described as "angry", appears in Dunsany's "The Sorrow of Search".

Summary
Nyarlathotep differs from the other beings in a number of ways. Most of them are exiled to stars, like Yog-Sothoth and Hastur, or sleeping and dreaming like Cthulhu; Nyarlathotep, however, is active and frequently walks the Earth in the guise of a human being, usually a tall, slim, joyous man. He has "a thousand" other forms, most of these reputed to be maddeningly horrific. Most of the Outer Gods have their own cults serving them; Nyarlathotep seems to serve these cults and take care of the deities' affairs in their absence. Most of the gods use strange alien languages, but Nyarlathotep uses human languages and can be mistaken for a human being. The other Outer Gods and Great Old Ones are often described as mindless or unfathomable rather than truly malevolent, but Nyarlathotep delights in cruelty, is deceptive and manipulative, and even cultivates followers and uses propaganda to achieve his goals.

Nyarlathotep enacts the will of the Outer Gods, and is their messenger, heart and soul; he is also a servant of Azathoth, his father, whose wishes he immediately fulfills. Unlike the other Outer Gods, causing madness is more important and enjoyable than death and destruction to Nyarlathotep. It is suggested by some that he will destroy the human race and possibly the Earth as well.

The Nyarlathotep Cycle

In 1996, Chaosium published The Nyarlathotep Cycle, a Cthulhu Mythos anthology focusing on works referring to or inspired by the entity Nyarlathotep. Edited by Lovecraft scholar Robert M. Price, the book includes an introduction by Price tracing the roots and development of the God of a Thousand Forms. The contents include:
 "Alhireth-Hotep the Prophet" by Lord Dunsany
 "The Sorrow of Search" by Lord Dunsany
 "Nyarlathotep" by H. P. Lovecraft
 "The Second Coming" (poem) by William Butler Yeats
 "Silence Falls on Mecca's Walls" (poem) by Robert E. Howard
 "Nyarlathotep" (poem) by H. P. Lovecraft
 "The Dreams in the Witch House" by H. P. Lovecraft
 "The Haunter of the Dark" by H. P. Lovecraft
 "The Dweller in Darkness" by August Derleth
 "The Titan in the Crypt" by J. G. Warner
 "Fane of the Black Pharaoh" by Robert Bloch
 "Curse of the Black Pharaoh" by Lin Carter
 "The Curse of Nephren-Ka" by John Cockroft
 "The Temple of Nephren-Ka" by Philip J. Rahman & Glenn A. Rahman
 "The Papyrus of Nephren-Ka" by Robert C. Culp
 "The Snout in the Alcove" by Gary Myers
 "The Contemplative Sphinx" (poem) by Richard L. Tierney
 "Ech-Pi-El’s Ægypt" (poems) by Ann K. Schwader

Notes

References
 Harms, Daniel. "Nyarlathotep" in The Encyclopedia Cthulhiana (2nd ed.), pp. 218–222. Oakland, CA: Chaosium, 1998. .

External links

 
 
 

Cthulhu Mythos deities
Chaos gods
Literary characters introduced in 1920
Fictional ancient Egyptians
Fictional pharaohs
Fictional shapeshifters
Fictional tricksters
Fictional characters with dream manipulation abilities
Fictional demons and devils
Fictional characters with immortality
Male literary villains
Fictional gods
Evil gods
Fictional extraterrestrial characters
Fictional monsters
Fiction about the Devil
Extraterrestrial supervillains

de:Cthulhu-Mythos#Nyarlathotep